Kanunga is a settlement in Kenya's Central Province.
Kanunga is emerging as a potential education hub with Kanunga High School, located at the heart of the village.
It is within Ndumberi ward, Kiambu Constituency within Kiambu County

References 

Populated places in Central Province (Kenya)